Baron Baudouin Michiels (born 17 May 1941) is a Belgian businessman, who worked mainly in the food industry.

Education
He obtained a PhD in Law, and a master's degree in Social Work (Licence en sciences sociales de travail).

Career
He started his professional career in 1963 as a trainee, with Rosenberg Onderneming in Amsterdam. In 1965 he became Marketing Assistant for Belamundi in Genval (Belgium). He began working for Côte-d'Or Belgium in 1967, where he was in charge of the Merchandising Department. In 1987 he became President-Managing Director Côte-d'Or Belgium, and after the acquisition of Côte-d'Or by Jacobs Suchard, he became President-Managing Director Jacobs Suchard Belgium and Executive Vice President of Jacobs Suchard Group. He held several leading positions in the Kraft Jacobs Suchard-Côte-d'Or group, until 17 May 2001 when an end came to his activities within the Philip Morris Group.

Beside his career in the food industry he holds several position in Non-Governmental Organisations (NGO). He is President of the Management Committee for the Prince Albert Fund, which distributes grants to young managers that want to achieve an international career. Baudouin Michiels is also President and CEO of the Belgacom Fund, which provides financial support to either local authorities or those of Social Services in Wallonia, Flanders, and in Brussels (region) that aim to improve the dialogue between the Belgian citizen and local authorities. He is a member of the Belgian businessclub Cercle de Lorraine.

Sources
 Proximus Foundation

1941 births
Living people
Belgian businesspeople